Philip Hope (24 April 1897 – 1969) was an English footballer who played as a full back for Norwich City, Blackburn Rovers, Southend United, Clapton Orient and Rochdale. He also played non-league football for various other clubs.

References

Washington F.C. players
Durham City A.F.C. players
Sunderland A.F.C. players
Norwich City F.C. players
Blackburn Rovers F.C. players
Southend United F.C. players
Leyton Orient F.C. players
Rochdale A.F.C. players
Birtley Town F.C. players
Walker Celtic F.C. players
Footballers from County Durham
1897 births
1969 deaths
English footballers
Association football defenders